The Ford Taunus 17 M is a middle-weight family saloon/sedan that was produced by Ford Germany between 1964 and 1967.   The entire range was first presented in September 1964 and volume production of the two and four door saloons/sedans began in November 1964. The "Turnier" (estate/station wagon) version followed in January 1965 with coupé bodied cars coming along some time later.

The Taunus 17M name had been applied to the car's predecessor and it would apply also to subsequent Ford models which is why the 17M introduced in 1964 is usually identified, in retrospect, as the Ford Taunus P5. It was the fifth newly designed German Ford to be launched after the war and for this reason it was from inception known within the company as Ford Project 5 (P5) or the Ford Taunus P5.

The car was slightly larger in its overall exterior dimensions than its predecessor, but appeared in many respects to be a slightly toned down evolution from the more radical “Badewannetaunus” which it replaced.  The big changes with the P5 were under the hood/bonnet where a broadened range of engines included, for the first time on a post-war German Ford,  a V6 engine. The Ford Taunus P5, thus propelled, was West Germany's least expensive 6-cylinder-engined car, and the “Turnier” estate version could be promoted as Germany's first (and for some years only) six-cylinder station wagon.

Evolutionary design
The Taunus P5 came as a modern monocoque three-box design, not dissimilar from its predecessor, but more conservative.  The design continued with its predecessor's still unusual avoidance of round headlamps. The rear panel might have been seen as following the silhouette of a bathtub, and there were those who applied the “Wanne” (Tub) soubriquet, reminiscent of the “Badewanne” soubriquet of the P3, but the P5 appeared to be more of a committee design, which may explain why the automotive press was by now losing its previous enthusiasm for promoting a new catchy nickname for each new Ford Taunus model launched.

New engines
All the four-cylinder cars were badged as Taunus 17Ms.  All the six-cylinder cars in the range were badged as Taunus 20Ms. A feature of all the engines which marked them out as "modern" was the over-square cylinder dimensions.

The entry level Taunus 17M was fitted with the 1498 cc V4 engine first seen two years earlier in the “Cardinal” Taunus P4. The mainstream models were powered by a 1699 cc unit:  this was now a newly developed V4 engine derived from the smaller 1498 cc unit with which it shared its  bore, but the stroke was slightly lengthened.

The Taunus P5 was the launch model for Ford's new V6 engine which was also a development from the company's V4 unit. Performance from the six-cylinder engine was boosted by the fitting, as standard equipment, of twin carburetters.

The P5 came with a “Startautomatik” which appears to have been a form of the automatic choke originally introduced in 1960 with the earlier 17M, but still something of a novelty in this class of car.

The least expensive of the six-cylinder 20Ms was aggressively priced at 7990 Marks. An Opel customer wishing to buy a six-cylinder car would need to find at least another 1400 Marks for the six-cylinder Kapitän-engined Opel Rekord which had been introduced in March 1964, presumably in anticipation of the arrival later in the same year of Ford's new six-cylinder Taunus.

Running gear
Power was transferred from the engine to the rear wheels via a three-speed all-synchromesh manual gear box controlled using a column-mounted lever. A four-speed box was available as an optional extra. A three-speed fully automatic “Taunomatik” transmission, modelled closely on the North American "Fordomatic" was listed from May 1966, although it was nearly the end of 1966 before a few Taunus P5s thus equipped began to be delivered.

Front disc brakes had become a standard feature on the previous model towards the end of its production run, and the P5 carried over from the P3 the combination of front disc brakes and rear drum brakes.  Servo-assistance for the brakes was standard on the top models and optional at extra cost further down the range.

The suspension followed what was becoming, especially for Fords in Europe, a conventional pattern, applying MacPherson struts at the front and a bream axle suspended on leaf springs at the back. The track was wider than on the previous models which a reporter at the time wrote was a cause of the P5's improved handling.

The electrical system was a six-volt one, which by now was seen as old fashioned. 12 V was introduced with the 1967 model.

Bodies
The car came with the same body options as before. Most customers chose the two- or four-door sedan/saloon. A “Turnier” station wagon was also offered with three or (for the first time on a Taunus) five doors.  The Hardtop-Coupé which appeared only in 1966  was virtually indistinguishable from the two-door sedan/saloon up to the car's waist-level, but a shortened roof line and an increased rake for the rear-window ensured that the price of the coupé's elegance was paid by rear seat passengers in terms of severely restricted head room. As before there was also a 2-door coach-built (Karl Deutsch) cabriolet conversion, but few of these were made and the cabriolets appear to have been disproportionately expensive.

Inside all the cars came with a bench seat at the front and at the back as standard apart from the top-of-the-line Taunus 20M TS which included individual front seats as standard. Individual seats were available at extra cost on the less exalted models, as part of a (by the standards of the time) long list of optional extras. The boot/trunk could be locked from the outside, and when this was done the adjacent fuel filler flap was locked automatically at the same time.

Commercial
The Ford Taunus P5 was reasonably successful. The company produced 710,059 between 1964 and 1967.

Nevertheless, the market was also growing and sales of the car's principal competitor, the Opel Rekord, were moving ahead faster,  with the Opel Rekord C the first of the two Opel Rekord versions that would each sell more than a million units. Unusually for a German-designed Ford at the time, the P5 was produced in right hand drive in South Africa and Southern Rhodesia.

Replacement
The Taunus P5 was replaced in 1967 by the Ford 17M/20M P7.

The Taunus P7 was considered blandly styled and sales disappointed.  Ford found themselves obliged to rush out a heavily upgraded version in 1968. In that context, the Taunus P5 would be remembered as a greater commercial success than it may have appeared at the time.

References

External links

 Ford-M-Modelle 1952–1972

P5
Mid-size cars
Cars introduced in 1964
Group 4 (racing) cars